Vulgar Latin, also known as Popular or Colloquial Latin, is the range of non-formal registers of Latin spoken from the Late Roman Republic onward. Through time, Vulgar Latin evolved into numerous Romance languages. Its literary counterpart was a form of either Classical Latin or Late Latin, depending on the time period.

Origin of the term 
During the Classical period, Roman authors referred to the informal, everyday variety of their own language as sermo plebeius or sermo vulgaris, meaning "common speech".

The modern usage of the term Vulgar Latin dates to the Renaissance, when Italian thinkers began to theorize that their own language originated in a sort of "corrupted" Latin that they assumed formed an entity distinct from the literary Classical variety, though opinions differed greatly on the nature of this "vulgar" dialect.

The early 19th-century French linguist Raynouard is often regarded as the father of modern Romance philology. Observing that the Romance languages have many features in common that are not found in Latin, at least not in "proper" or Classical Latin, he concluded that the former must have all had some common ancestor (which he believed most closely resembled Old Occitan) that replaced Latin some time before the year 1000. This he dubbed la langue romane or "the Roman language".

The first truly modern treatise on Romance linguistics, however, and the first to apply the comparative method, was Friedrich Christian Diez's seminal Grammar of the Romance Languages.

Sources 

Evidence for the features of non-literary Latin comes from the following sources:

 Recurrent grammatical, syntactic, or orthographic mistakes in Latin epigraphy.
 The insertion, whether intentional or not, of colloquial terms or constructions into contemporary texts.
 Explicit mention of certain constructions or pronunciation habits by Roman grammarians.
 The pronunciation of Roman-era lexical borrowings into neighboring languages such as Basque, Albanian, or Welsh.

History 
By the end of the first century AD the Romans had conquered the entire Mediterranean Basin and established hundreds of colonies in the conquered provinces. Over time this—along with other factors that encouraged linguistic and cultural assimilation, such as political unity, frequent travel and commerce, military service, etc.—made Latin the predominant language throughout the western Mediterranean. Latin itself was subject to the same assimilatory tendencies, such that its varieties had probably become more uniform by the time the Western Empire fell in 476 than they had been before it. That is not to say that the language had been static for all those years, but rather that ongoing changes tended to spread to all regions.

All of these homogenizing factors were disrupted or voided by a long string of calamities. Although Justinian succeeded in reconquering Italy, Africa, and the southern part of Iberia in the period 533–554, the Empire was hit by one of the deadliest plagues in recorded history in 541, one that would recur six more times before 610. Under his successors most of the Italian peninsula was lost to the Lombards by c. 572, most of southern Iberia to the Visigoths by c. 615, and most of the Balkans to the Slavs and Avars by c. 620. All this was possible due to Roman preoccupation with wars against Persia, the last of which lasted nearly three decades and exhausted both empires. Taking advantage of this, the Arabs invaded and occupied Syria and Egypt by 642, greatly weakening the Empire and ending its centuries of domination over the Mediterranean. They went on to take the rest of North Africa by c. 699 and soon invaded the Visigothic Kingdom as well, seizing most of Iberia from it by c. 716.

It is from approximately the seventh century onward that regional differences proliferate in the language of Latin documents, indicating the fragmentation of Latin into the incipient Romance languages. Until then Latin appears to have been remarkably homogeneous, as far as can be judged from its written records, although careful statistical analysis reveals regional differences in the treatment of the Latin vowel /ĭ/ and in the progression of betacism by about the fifth century.

Vocabulary

Lexical turnover 
Over the centuries, spoken Latin lost various lexical items and replaced them with native coinages; with borrowings from neighbouring languages such as Gaulish, Germanic, or Greek; or with other native words that had undergone semantic shift. The literary language generally retained the older words, however.

A textbook example is the general replacement of the suppletive Classical verb ferre, meaning 'carry', with the regular portare. Similarly, the Classical loqui, meaning 'speak', was replaced by a variety of alternatives such as the native fabulari and narrare or the Greek borrowing parabolare.

Classical Latin particles fared especially poorly, with all of the following vanishing from popular speech: an, at, autem, donec, enim, etiam, haud, igitur, ita, nam, postquam, quidem, quin, quoad, quoque, sed, sive, utrum, and vel.

Semantic drift 
Many surviving words experienced a shift in meaning. Some notable cases are civitas ('citizenry' → 'city', replacing urbs); focus ('hearth' → 'fire', replacing ignis); manducare ('chew' → 'eat', replacing edere); causa ('subject matter' → 'thing', competing with res); mittere ('send' → 'put', competing with ponere); necare ('murder' → 'drown', competing with submergere); pacare ('placate' → 'pay', competing with solvere), and totus ('whole' → 'all, every', competing with omnis).

Phonological development

Consonantism

Loss of nasals 

 Word-final /m/ was lost in polysyllabic words. In monosyllables it tended to survive as /n/.
 /n/ was usually lost before fricatives, resulting in compensatory lengthening of the preceding vowel (e.g. sponsa ‘fiancée’ > spōsa).

Palatalization 
Front vowels in hiatus (after a consonant and before another vowel) became [j], which palatalized preceding consonants.

Fricativization 

/w/ (except after /k/) and intervocalic /b/ merge as the bilabial fricative /β/.

Simplification of consonant clusters 

 The cluster /nkt/ reduced to [ŋt].
 /kw/ delabialized to /k/ before back vowels.
 /ks/ before or after a consonant, or at the end of a word, reduced to /s/.

Vocalism

Monophthongization 
/ae̯/ and /oe̯/ monophthongized to [ɛː] and [eː] respectively by around the second century AD.

Loss of vowel quantity 
The system of phonemic vowel length collapsed by the fifth century AD, leaving quality differences as the distinguishing factor between vowels; the paradigm thus changed from /ī ĭ ē ĕ ā ă ŏ ō ŭ ū/ to /i ɪ e ɛ a ɔ o ʊ u/. Concurrently, stressed vowels in open syllables lengthened.

Loss of near-close front vowel 
Towards the end of the Roman Empire /ɪ/ merged with /e/ in most regions, although not in Africa or a few peripheral areas in Italy.

Grammar

Romance articles 
It is difficult to place the point in which the definite article, absent in Latin but present in all Romance languages, arose, largely because the highly colloquial speech in which it arose was seldom written down until the daughter languages had strongly diverged; most surviving texts in early Romance show the articles fully developed.

While most of the Romance languages put the article before the noun, Romanian has its own way, by putting the article after the noun, e.g. lupul ("the wolf" – from *lupum illum) and omul ("the man" – *homo illum), possibly a result of being within the Balkan sprachbund.

This demonstrative is used in a number of contexts in some early texts in ways that suggest that the Latin demonstrative was losing its force. The Vetus Latina Bible contains a passage Est tamen ille daemon sodalis peccati ("The devil is a companion of sin"), in a context that suggests that the word meant little more than an article. The need to translate sacred texts that were originally in Koine Greek, which had a definite article, may have given Christian Latin an incentive to choose a substitute. Aetheria uses ipse similarly: per mediam vallem ipsam ("through the middle of the valley"), suggesting that it too was weakening in force.

Gregory of Tours writes, Erat autem... beatissimus Anianus in supradicta civitate episcopus ("Blessed Anianus was bishop in that city.") The original Latin demonstrative adjectives were no longer felt to be strong or specific enough.

On the other hand, even in the Oaths of Strasbourg, no demonstrative appears even in places where one would clearly be called for in all the later languages (pro christian poblo – "for the Christian people"). Using the demonstratives as articles may have still been considered overly informal for a royal oath in the 9th century. Considerable variation exists in all of the Romance vernaculars as to their actual use: in Romanian, the articles are suffixed to the noun (or an adjective preceding it), as in other languages of the Balkan sprachbund and the North Germanic languages.

The numeral ,  (one) supplies the indefinite article in all cases (again, this is a common semantic development across Europe). This is anticipated in Classical Latin; Cicero writes cum uno gladiatore nequissimo ("with a most immoral gladiator"). This suggests that unus was beginning to supplant  in the meaning of "a certain" or "some" by the 1st century BC.

Loss of neuter gender 

The three grammatical genders of Classical Latin were replaced by a two-gender system in most Romance languages.

The neuter gender of classical Latin was in most cases identical with the masculine both syntactically and morphologically. The confusion had already started in Pompeian graffiti, e.g. cadaver mortuus for cadaver mortuum ("dead body"), and hoc locum for hunc locum ("this place"). The morphological confusion shows primarily in the adoption of the nominative ending -us (-Ø after -r) in the o-declension.

Most of these forms occur in the speech of one man: Trimalchion, an uneducated Greek (i.e. foreign) freedman.

In modern Romance languages, the nominative s-ending has been largely abandoned, and all substantives of the o-declension have an ending derived from -um: -u, -o, or -Ø. However, Old French still had -s in the nominative and -Ø in the accusative in both words: murs, ciels [nominative] – mur, ciel [oblique].

For some neuter nouns of the third declension, the oblique stem was productive; for others, the nominative/accusative form, (the two were identical in Classical Latin). Evidence suggests that the neuter gender was under pressure well back into the imperial period. French (le) , Catalan (la) , Occitan (lo) , Spanish (la) , Portuguese (o) , Italian language (il) , Leonese (el) lleche and Romanian (le) ("milk"), all derive from the non-standard but attested Latin nominative/accusative neuter  or accusative masculine . In Spanish the word became feminine, while in French, Portuguese and Italian it became masculine (in Romanian it remained neuter, /). Other neuter forms, however, were preserved in Romance; Catalan and French , Leonese, Portuguese and Italian , Romanian  ("name") all preserve the Latin nominative/accusative nomen, rather than the oblique stem form *nominem (which nevertheless produced Spanish ).

Some Romance languages still have a special form derived from the ancient neuter plural which is treated grammatically as feminine: e.g.,  : BRACCHIA "arm(s)" → Italian (il)  : (le) braccia, Romanian  : brațe(le). Cf. also Merovingian Latin ipsa animalia aliquas mortas fuerant.

Alternations in Italian heteroclitic nouns such as l'uovo fresco ("the fresh egg") / le uova fresche ("the fresh eggs") are usually analysed as masculine in the singular and feminine in the plural, with an irregular plural in -a. However, it is also consistent with their historical development to say that  is simply a regular neuter noun (plural ova) and that the characteristic ending for words agreeing with these nouns is -o in the singular and -e in the plural. The same alternation in gender exists in certain Romanian nouns, but is considered regular as it is more common than in Italian. Thus, a relict neuter gender can arguably be said to persist in Italian and Romanian.

In Portuguese, traces of the neuter plural can be found in collective formations and words meant to inform a bigger size or sturdiness. Thus, one can use /ovos ("egg/eggs") and /ovas ("roe", "a collection of eggs"), /bordos ("section(s) of an edge") and /bordas ("edge/edges"), /sacos ("bag/bags") and /sacas ("sack/sacks"), /mantos ("cloak/cloaks") and /mantas ("blanket/blankets"). Other times, it resulted in words whose gender may be changed more or less arbitrarily, like / ("fruit"), / (broth"), etc.

These formations were especially common when they could be used to avoid irregular forms.  In Latin, the names of trees were usually feminine, but many were declined in the second declension paradigm, which was dominated by masculine or neuter nouns. Latin  ("pear tree"), a feminine noun with a masculine-looking ending, became masculine in Italian (il)  and Romanian ; in French and Spanish it was replaced by the masculine derivations (le) , (el) ; and in Portuguese and Catalan by the feminine derivations (a) , (la) .

As usual, irregularities persisted longest in frequently used forms. From the fourth declension noun manus ("hand"), another feminine noun with the ending -us, Italian and Spanish derived (la) , Romanian mânu> pl (reg.)mâini/, Catalan (la) , and Portuguese (a) , which preserve the feminine gender along with the masculine appearance.

Except for the Italian and Romanian heteroclitic nouns, other major Romance languages have no trace of neuter nouns, but still have neuter pronouns.

The last is used with nouns denoting abstract categories: lo bueno, literally "that which is good", from : good.

Loss of oblique cases 
The Vulgar Latin vowel shifts caused the merger of several case endings in the nominal and adjectival declensions. Some of the causes include: the loss of final m, the merger of ă with ā, and the merger of ŭ with ō (see tables). Thus, by the 5th century, the number of case contrasts had been drastically reduced.

There also seems to be a marked tendency to confuse different forms even when they had not become homophonous (like the generally more distinct plurals), which indicates that nominal declension was shaped not only by phonetic mergers, but also by structural factors. As a result of the untenability of the noun case system after these phonetic changes, Vulgar Latin shifted from a markedly synthetic language to a more analytic one.

The genitive case died out around the 3rd century AD, according to Meyer-Lübke, and began to be replaced by "de"  + noun (which originally meant "about/concerning", weakened to "of") as early as the 2nd century BC. Exceptions of remaining genitive forms are some pronouns, certain fossilized expressions and some proper names. For example, French  ("Thursday") < Old French juesdi < Vulgar Latin ""; Spanish es  ("it is necessary") < "est "; and Italian  ("earthquake") < "" as well as names like Paoli, Pieri.

The dative case lasted longer than the genitive, even though Plautus, in the 2nd century BC, already shows some instances of substitution by the construction "ad" + accusative. For example, "ad carnuficem dabo".

The accusative case developed as a prepositional case, displacing many instances of the ablative. Towards the end of the imperial period, the accusative came to be used more and more as a general oblique case.

Despite increasing case mergers, nominative and accusative forms seem to have remained distinct for much longer, since they are rarely confused in inscriptions. Even though Gaulish texts from the 7th century rarely confuse both forms, it is believed that both cases began to merge in Africa by the end of the empire, and a bit later in parts of Italy and Iberia. Nowadays, Romanian maintains a two-case system, while Old French and Old Occitan had a two-case subject-oblique system.

This Old French system was based largely on whether or not the Latin case ending contained an "s" or not, with the "s" being retained but all vowels in the ending being lost (as with veisin below). But since this meant that it was easy to confuse the singular nominative with the plural oblique, and the plural nominative with the singular oblique, this case system ultimately collapsed as well, and Middle French adopted one case (usually the oblique) for all purposes. 

Today, Romanian is generally considered the only Romance language with a surviving case system. However, some dialects of Romansh retain a special predicative form of the masculine singular identical to the plural: il bien vin ("the good wine") vs. il vin ei buns ("the wine is good"). This "predicative case" (as it is sometimes called) is a remnant of the Latin nominative in -us.

Wider use of prepositions 
Loss of a productive noun case system meant that the syntactic purposes it formerly served now had to be performed by prepositions and other paraphrases. These particles increased in number, and many new ones were formed by compounding old ones. The descendant Romance languages are full of grammatical particles such as Spanish , "where", from Latin  +  (which in Romanian literally means "from where"/"where from"), or French , "since", from  + , while the equivalent Spanish and Portuguese  is de + ex + de. Spanish  and Portuguese , "after", represent de + ex + .

Some of these new compounds appear in literary texts during the late empire; French , Spanish de  and Portuguese de  ("outside") all represent de +  (Romanian  – ad + foris), and we find Jerome writing stulti, nonne qui fecit, quod de foris est, etiam id, quod de intus est fecit? (Luke 11.40: "ye fools, did not he, that made which is without, make that which is within also?"). In some cases, compounds were created by combining a large number of particles, such as the Romanian  ("just recently") from ad + de + in + illa + hora.

Classical Latin:
Marcus patrī librum dat. "Marcus is giving [his] father [a/the] book."

Vulgar Latin:
*Marcos da libru a patre. "Marcus is giving [a/the] book to [his] father."

Just as in the disappearing dative case, colloquial Latin sometimes replaced the disappearing genitive case with the preposition de followed by the ablative, then eventually the accusative (oblique).

Classical Latin:
Marcus mihi librum patris dat. "Marcus is giving me [his] father's book.

Vulgar Latin:
*Marcos mi da libru de patre. "Marcus is giving me [the] book of [his] father."

Pronouns 
Unlike in the nominal and adjectival inflections, pronouns kept great part of the case distinctions. However, many changes happened.

Adverbs 
All of these derivational suffixes were lost in Vulgar Latin, where adverbs were invariably formed by a feminine ablative form modifying , which was originally the ablative of mēns, and so meant "with a ... mind".
This explains the widespread rule for forming adverbs in many Romance languages: add the suffix -ment(e) to the feminine form of the adjective. The development illustrates a textbook case of grammaticalization in which an autonomous form, the noun meaning 'mind', while still in free lexical use in e.g. Italian venire in mente 'come to mind', becomes a productive suffix for forming adverbs in Romance such as Italian , Spanish  'clearly', with both its source and its meaning opaque in that usage other than as adverb formant.

Verbs 

In general, the verbal system in the Romance languages changed less from Classical Latin than did the nominal system.

The four conjugational classes generally survived. The second and third conjugations already had identical imperfect tense forms in Latin, and also shared a common present participle. Because of the merging of short i with long ē in most of Vulgar Latin, these two conjugations grew even closer together. Several of the most frequently-used forms became indistinguishable, while others became distinguished only by stress placement:

These two conjugations came to be conflated in many of the Romance languages, often by merging them into a single class while taking endings from each of the original two conjugations. Which endings survived was different for each language, although most tended to favour second conjugation endings over the third conjugation. Spanish, for example, mostly eliminated the third conjugation forms in favour of second conjugation forms.

French and Catalan did the same, but tended to generalise the third conjugation infinitive instead. Catalan in particular almost eliminated the second conjugation ending over time, reducing it to a small relic class. In Italian, the two infinitive endings remained separate (but spelled identically), while the conjugations merged in most other respects much as in the other languages. However, the third-conjugation third-person plural present ending survived in favour of the second conjugation version, and was even extended to the fourth conjugation. Romanian also maintained the distinction between the second and third conjugation endings.

In the perfect, many languages generalized the -aui ending most frequently found in the first conjugation. This led to an unusual development; phonetically, the ending was treated as the diphthong  rather than containing a semivowel , and in other cases the  sound was simply dropped. Thus Latin amaui, amauit ("I loved; he/she loved") in many areas became proto-Romance *amai and *amaut, yielding for example Portuguese amei, amou.

Another major systemic change was to the future tense, remodelled in Vulgar Latin with auxiliary verbs. A new future was originally formed with the auxiliary verb , *amare habeo, literally "to love I have" (cf. English "I have to love", which has shades of a future meaning). This was contracted into a new future suffix in Western Romance forms, which can be seen in the following modern examples of "I will love":
  (je + aimer + ai) ← aimer ["to love"] + ai ["I have"].
  (amar + [h]o) ← amare ["to love"] + ho ["I have"].

The first historical attestation of this new future can be found in a 7th-century Latin lext, the Chronicle of Fredegar

A periphrastic construction of the form 'to have to' (late Latin habere ad) used as future is characteristic of Sardinian: 
 Ap'a istàre < apo a istàre 'I will stay'
 Ap'a nàrrere < apo a nàrrer 'I will say'

An innovative conditional (distinct from the subjunctive) also developed in the same way (infinitive + conjugated form of habere). The fact that the future and conditional endings were originally independent words is still evident in literary Portuguese, which in these tenses allows clitic object pronouns to be incorporated between the root of the verb and its ending: "I will love" (eu) amarei, but "I will love you" amar-te-ei, from amar + te ["you"] + (eu) hei = amar + te + [h]ei = amar-te-ei.

In Spanish, Italian and Portuguese, personal pronouns can still be omitted from verb phrases as in Latin, as the endings are still distinct enough to convey that information: venio > Sp vengo ("I come"). In French, however, all the endings are typically homophonous except the first and second person (and occasionally also third person) plural, so the pronouns are always used (je viens) except in the imperative.

Contrary to the millennia-long continuity of much of the active verb system, which has now survived 6000 years of known evolution, the synthetic passive voice was utterly lost in Romance, being replaced with periphrastic verb forms—composed of the verb "to be" plus a passive participle—or impersonal reflexive forms—composed of a verb and a passivizing pronoun.

Apart from the grammatical and phonetic developments there were many cases of verbs merging as complex subtleties in Latin were reduced to simplified verbs in Romance. A classic example of this are the verbs expressing the concept "to go". In Spanish and Portuguese ire and vadere merged into the verb ir, which derives some conjugated forms from ire and some from vadere. andar was maintained as a separate verb derived from ambitare.

Italian instead merged vadere and ambitare into the verb . At the extreme French merged three Latin verbs with, for example, the present tense deriving from vadere and another verb ambulare (or something like it) and the future tense deriving from ire. 
In Italian, the verb  inherited both Romance meanings of "being essentially" and "being temporarily of the quality of", while  specialized into a verb denoting location or dwelling, or state of health.

Copula 

This evolved to *essere in Vulgar Latin by attaching the common infinitive suffix -re to the classical infinitive; this produced Italian  and French  through Proto-Gallo-Romance *essre and Old French  as well as Spanish and Portuguese  (Romanian a  derives from fieri, which means "to become").

In Vulgar Latin a second copula developed utilizing the verb , which originally meant (and is cognate with) "to stand", to denote a more temporary meaning. That is, *essere signified the essence, while stare signified the state. Stare evolved to Spanish and Portuguese  and Old French  (both through *estare), Romanian "a sta" ("to stand"), using the original form for the noun ("stare"="state"/"starea"="the state"), while Italian retained the original form.

The semantic shift that underlies this evolution is more or less as follows: A speaker of Classical Latin might have said: vir est in foro, meaning "the man is in/at the marketplace". The same sentence in Vulgar Latin could have been *(h)omo stat in foro, "the man stands in/at the marketplace", replacing the est (from esse) with stat (from stare), because "standing" was what was perceived as what the man was actually doing.

The use of stare in this case was still semantically transparent assuming that it meant "to stand", but soon the shift from esse to stare became more widespread. In the Iberian peninsula esse ended up only denoting natural qualities that would not change, while stare was applied to transient qualities and location. In Italian, stare is used mainly for location, transitory state of health (sta male 's/he is ill' but è gracile 's/he is puny') and, as in Spanish, for the eminently transient quality implied in a verb's progressive form, such as sto scrivendo to express 'I am writing'.

The historical development of the stare + ablative gerund progressive tense in those Romance languages that have it seems to have been a passage from a usage such as sto pensando 'I stand/stay (here) in thinking', in which the stare form carries the full semantic load of 'stand, stay' to grammaticalization of the construction as expression of progressive aspect (Similar in concept to the Early Modern English construction of "I am a-thinking"). The process of reanalysis that took place over time bleached the semantics of stare so that when used in combination with the gerund the form became solely a grammatical marker of subject and tense (e.g. sto = subject first person singular, present; stavo = subject first person singular, past), no longer a lexical verb with the semantics of 'stand' (not unlike the auxiliary in compound tenses that once meant 'have, possess', but is now semantically empty: j'ai écrit, ho scritto, he escrito, etc.). Whereas sto scappando would once have been semantically strange at best (?'I stay escaping'), once grammaticalization was achieved, collocation with a verb of inherent mobility was no longer contradictory, and sto scappando could and did become the normal way to express 'I am escaping'. (Although it might be objected that in sentences like Spanish la catedral está en la ciudad, "the cathedral is in the city" this is also unlikely to change, but all locations are expressed through estar in Spanish, as this usage originally conveyed the sense of "the cathedral stands in the city").

Word order typology 
Classical Latin in most cases adopted an SOV word order in ordinary prose, although other word orders were employed, such as in poetry, enabled by inflectional marking of the grammatical function of words. However, word order in the modern Romance languages generally adopted a standard SVO word order. This had to develop as a result of stylistic changes in the language over time. The object of the word can be after the verb to break monotony of the verb final structure and/or place emphasis on the object. This style became evidently more predominant over time and widespread in Romance. Fragments of SOV word order still survive in the placement of clitic object pronouns (e.g. Spanish yo te amo "I love you").

See also 

 Proto-Romance
 Romance copula
 Romance languages
 Reichenau Glosses
 Oaths of Strasbourg
 Veronese Riddle
 Glosas Emilianenses
 Gallo-Romance
 Gallo-Italic
 Ibero-Roman
 Common Romanian
 Daco-Roman
 Thraco-Roman

History of specific Romance languages 
 Sicilian
 Catalan phonology
 History of French
 History of Italian
 History of Portuguese
 History of the Spanish language
 History of the Romanian language
 Old French

References

Citations

Works consulted 

 General
 
 
 
 

 Carlton, Charles Merritt. 1973. A linguistic analysis of a collection of Late Latin documents composed in Ravenna between A.D. 445–700. The Hague: Mouton.
 
 
 
 
 Gouvert, Xavier. 2016. Du protoitalique au protoroman: Deux problèmes de reconstruction phonologique. In: Buchi, Éva & Schweickard, Wolfgang (eds.), Dictionnaire étymologique roman 2, 27–51. Berlin: De Gruyter.
 
 
 
 
 
 Leppänen, V., & Alho, T. 2018. On the mergers of Latin close-mid vowels. Transactions of the Philological Society 116. 460–483.
 
 
 Nandris, Grigore. 1951. The development and structure of Rumanian. The Slavonic and East European Review, 30. 7-39.
 
 Pei, Mario. 1941. The Italian language. New York: Columbia University Press.
 Pei, Mario & Gaeng, Paul A. 1976. The story of Latin and the Romance languages. New York: Harker & Row.
 

 
 Treadgold, Warren. 1997. A history of the Byzantine state and society. Stanford University Press.

Transitions to Romance languages 

 To Romance in general
 
 
 Ledgeway, Adam (2012). From Latin to Romance: Morphosyntactic Typology and Change. Oxford: Oxford University Press.
 
  (esp. parts 1 & 2, Latin and the Making of the Romance Languages; The Transition from Latin to the Romance Languages) 
 
 

 To French
 
 
 
 
 

 To Italian
 
 

 To Spanish
 
 
 
 

 To Portuguese
 
 
 

 To Occitan
 

 To Sardinian

Further reading 
 Adams, James Noel. 1976. The Text and Language of a Vulgar Latin Chronicle (Anonymus Valesianus II). London: University of London, Institute of Classical Studies.
 --. 1977. The Vulgar Latin of the letters of Claudius Terentianus. Manchester, UK: Manchester Univ. Press.
 --. 2013. Social Variation and the Latin Language. Cambridge: Cambridge University Press.
 Burghini, Julia, and Javier Uría. 2015. "Some neglected evidence on Vulgar Latin 'glide suppression': Consentius, 27.17.20 N." Glotta; Zeitschrift Für Griechische Und Lateinische Sprache 91: 15–26. .
 Jensen, Frede. 1972. From Vulgar Latin to Old Provençal. Chapel Hill: University of North Carolina Press.
 Lakoff, Robin Tolmach. 2006. Vulgar Latin: Comparative Castration (and Comparative Theories of Syntax). Style 40, nos. 1–2: 56–61. .
 Rohlfs, Gerhard. 1970. From Vulgar Latin to Old French: An Introduction to the Study of the Old French Language. Detroit: Wayne State University Press.
 Scarpanti, Edoardo. 2012. Saggi linguistici sul latino volgare. Mantova: Universitas Studiorum. .
 Weiss, Michael. 2009. Outline of the historical and comparative grammar of Latin. Ann Arbor, MI: Beechstave.

External links 

 
 
 

Latin language in ancient Rome
Forms of Latin
Gallo-Roman culture